Discord is an online application for messaging and audio/video communication.

Discord may also refer to:

Film and TV
 Discord (film), a 1933 British drama
 Discord, a character from the 2010 television series My Little Pony: Friendship Is Magic

Music
 Discord, dissonance in music
 Discord, a 1997 album by Ryuichi Sakamoto
 Discord (album), a 2004 album by Bomb Factory
 Discord, a 2004 album by Stewart Walker
 "Discord", a 2004 song by Bomb Factory from the album Discord
 "Discord", a 2006 song by the Fire Engines
 "Discord", a 2007 song by After Forever from the album After Forever
 "Fukyōwaon" (or "Discord"), a 2017 song by Keyakizaka46

Places
 Discord, the name of a former unincorporated community in Kedron Township
 "Block of Discord", the English translation of Illa de la Discòrdia, a city block in Barcelona, Spain
 Cape Discord, a headland in Greenland

Other uses
 Discord (or Discordia), the Roman equivalent to the Greek goddess Eris
 Quantum discord, a quantity in quantum information science
 Semantic discord, an argument arising when two parties assign different meanings to the same word

See also 
 The Apple of Discord, an object from Greek mythology that caused strife among the gods, or by metaphor the core, kernel, or crux of an argument
 Dischord Records, a punk and alternative record label
 
 
 Discordant (disambiguation)
 Discordia (disambiguation)
 Discordianism